Tali Parish was a rural municipality of Estonia, in Pärnu County. It had a population of 743 (2003) and an area of 194.43 km².

On 16 June 2005 Tali Parish joined with Saarde Parish.

Populated places

References

Pärnu County
Former municipalities of Estonia